The Brit Award for British Hip Hop/Grime/Rap Act is an award given by the British Phonographic Industry (BPI), an organisation which represents record companies and artists in the United Kingdom. The accolade was presented at the Brit Awards, an annual celebration of British and international music. The winners and nominees were determined by the Brit Awards voting academy with over one-thousand members comprising record labels, publishers, managers, agents, media, and previous winners and nominees.

The first winner of the award was Ms. Dynamite in 2003. Lemar is the only two-time winner in the category while Dizzee Rascal holds the record for most nominations without a win, with three. The current holder of the award is Aitch, who won the category in 2023.

History
The award was first presented as Best British Urban Act at the 2003 Brit Awards and last presented in 2006. 

In 2021, it was announced that the category had been revived and renamed Best British Hip Hop/Grime/Rap Act following the removal of gendered categories. This new iteration of the award was first presented at the 42nd Brit Awards and is voted for by the public along with the three other genre categories (Pop/R&B Act, Dance Act and Rock/Alternative Act).

Winners and nominees

British Urban Act (2003-2006)

British Hip Hop/Grime/Rap Act (2022-present)

Multiple nominations and awards

Notes
 Ms. Dynamite (2003), Joss Stone (2005) also won Brit Award for British Female Solo Artist

References

Brit Awards
Hip hop awards
Rhythm and blues
Awards established in 2003